The 2nd Directors Guild of America Awards, honoring the outstanding directorial achievements in film in 1949, were presented in 1950.

Winners and nominees

Film

Special awards

External links
 

Directors Guild of America Awards
1949 film awards
1949 television awards
1949 in American cinema
1949 in American television